Gottfried Weber may refer to:

 Gottfried Weber (1779–1839), German music theorist
 Gottfried Weber (general) (1899–1958), German military person